Smithland may refer to the following places in the United States:

Smithland, Indiana
Smithland, Iowa
Smithland, Kentucky
Smithland (Natchez, Mississippi), listed on the NRHP in Mississippi
Smithland Farm (Henderson, West Virginia), listed on the NRHP in West Virginia